You're An Education is a 1938 Warner Bros. Merrie Melodies cartoon supervised by Frank Tashlin. The short was released on November 5, 1938.

Plot
The literary characters spring to life in this "it's-midnight-and-everything-comes-to-life" cartoon, this time from brochures in a travel agency with first a bunch of tableaux, followed by a big song, then a crime story.

Following a spinning globe, the front window of the agency appears, where there are affixed several banners and posters advertising various countries. As the different ads are shown, a song - sometimes presented as a pun - is heard. For example: We see a picture of Bombay harbor, in which bombs explode.

Eventually, the songs stray into puns about food. "Food's an Education," leads to references to  Hungary, Turkey, the Sandwich Islands, Hamburg, Chile (chili), Oyster Bay, Twin Forks and Java. 

The Thief of Bagdad uses the Florida Keys to break into the Kimberly Diamond Mine, and then pawns them with the Pawnee Indians. He is chased by soldiers and police of many nations, but gets away by forming an "unusual alliance" with the Lone Stranger: "Well, you're not alone now, Beeg Boy!"

References

External links

1938 films
1938 animated films
Merrie Melodies short films
Short films directed by Frank Tashlin
1930s American animated films
Films scored by Carl Stalling